Chassalla is a German band centered on Mark Hessburg.

Band history

1989-1994
Chassalla was founded by Mark Hessburg in 1989, Johannes Häusler (from the Canadian synth pop band Psyche) joined the Project in 1992 in the final production phase of the first CD album "Shadows". After the "Shadows" Tour and 3 compilation releases Häusler left Chassalla in 1994 during the production of the second Chassalla album "Mistress" (1993–1994), after a controversy in the studio of the producer Carlos Perón (Yello). "Mistress" was never released but two Songs made it on the third album "Phoenix out of the ashes" (1995–1996).

1994-1999
Matthias Rode and Christian Rossbach joined Chassalla in 1995 and the Band got a new contract with the German label SPV. Stephanie Kühn (Background Vocals) and Frank Matthäus (Guitars) joined 1996 for the recording sessions of "Phoenix - out of the ashes". After the release of the third album the Band paused while Mark Hessburg founded the "Green-Hill audio design" Studios in Kassel, Germany. During the next years the Band came apart and Christian Rossbach joined the Gothic Band Madre del Vizio.

1999-2005
In 1999 Sony Music Germany was interested in Chassalla and Hessburg worked in his spare time together with Ira Göbel on new songs but they never released any of them. Today Hessburg, Häusler and Rode are working on a comeback of Chassalla in 2008.

Discography

Albums
1996: Chassalla - Phoenix out of the ashes (Oblivion / SPV / Eisenberg / Warner/Chappell Music)
1994: Chassalla - Mistress (never released)
1992: Chassalla - Shadows (Dead per Beat / Apollyon / EFA)

Compilation albums
2005: Beyond the Skies (Shift Music Media / Zyx)
2004: Mystic Dreams Vol. 1 (Edel Records)
2003: Dragons And Dreams (Sony Music)
2003: Mystic Beats 2 (Zyx music)
2003: Mystic Spirits 8 (Zyx music)
1999: Cryptichon (SPV)
1998: The Power of Gothic (SPV)
1996: Piercing your mind (SPV)
1994: Celtic Circle Sampler II (Celtic Circle Productions / Semaphore)
1993: Electronic Youth (Music Research / Semaphore)
1993: Celtic Circle Sampler (Celtic Circle Productions / Semaphore)
1992: The Queen is dead (Outo-o-Space / EFA)

External links
  Chassalla on myspace.com

German musical groups